Edward Livingston Wilson (1838-1903) was an American photographer, writer and publisher. In Philadelphia in the 1860s he worked for Frederick Gutekunst and in 1864 he began the Philadelphia Photographer magazine. He served as an energetic officer of the National Photographic Association of the United States. In 1869 he joined the "Eclipse Expedition" in Iowa overseen by Henry Morton, and in 1881 travelled to the Middle East. In New York City he published  Wilson's Photographic Magazine starting in 1889. Collaborators included Michael F. Benerman and William H. Rau. Readers included Edward S. Curtis.

References

Further reading

Works by Wilson
Written, photographed, and/or edited by Wilson
  1864-
 1880
 1883
 1895
  
 v.3, 1866
 v.4, 1867
 v.6, 1869
 v.7, 1870
 v.8, 1871
 v.9, 1872
  v.26
 
 
 
 
 
 
 . Includes photos of Jerusalem, Petra, Thebes, Tiberias.
 

Other authors published by Wilson

Works about Wilson

External links

 U.S. Library of Congress. Works by Wilson
 New York Public Library. Works by Wilson
 Princeton University Library. Blog post about Wilson.

American publishers (people)
1838 births
1903 deaths
Artists from Philadelphia
Writers from Philadelphia
People from Flemington, New Jersey
19th-century American photographers
19th-century American writers
19th-century American businesspeople